{{Infobox Boxingmatch
| Fight Name    = The Grand Finale
| fight date    = November 18, 2006
| image         = 
| location      = Thomas & Mack Center, Paradise, Nevada, United States
| titles        = WBC International super featherweight title
| fighter1      = Manny Pacquiao
| nickname1     = Pac-Man
| record1       = 42–3–2 (33 KO)
| hometown1     = General Santos, Philippines
| height1       = 5 ft 6+1/2 in
|weight1 = 129 lbs
|style1 = Southpaw
| recognition1  = WBC International super featherweight champion [[The Ring (magazine)|The Ring]] No. 3 ranked pound-for-pound fighter3-division world champion
| fighter2      = Érik Morales 
| nickname2     = El Terrible("The Terrible")
| record2       = 48–4 (34 KO)
| hometown2     = Tijuana, Baja California, Mexico
| height2       = 5 ft 8 in
|weight2 = 129 lbs
|style2 = Orthodox
| recognition2  = 3-division world champion
| result        = Pacquiao wins via 3rd-round KO
}}
Manny Pacquiao vs. Érik Morales III, billed as The Grand Finale'', was a super featherweight boxing match. The bout took place on November 18, 2006 at the Thomas & Mack Center, Las Vegas, Nevada, United States and was distributed by HBO PPV. The bout is the last of the Pacquiao-Morales trilogy, widely considered one of the greatest boxing trilogies of all time. The fight also marked a return to HBO for Pacquiao, and his first fight in his four-year contract with Top Rank as his promoter.

Similar to the second fight, Pacquiao entirely dominated the fight, scoring a total of three knockdowns to knock out Morales in the third round.

The winner of the fight was supposed to be the mandatory challenger of WBC super featherweight champion Marco Antonio Barrera but was cancelled due to the legal dispute between Top Rank and Golden Boy Promotions.

References

Morales
2006 in boxing
Boxing in Las Vegas
2006 in sports in Nevada
Boxing on HBO
November 2006 sports events in the United States